Tradescantia hirsutiflora, commonly called hairyflower spiderwort, is a species of plant in the spiderwort family that is native to the south-central United States of America.

References

hirsutiflora
Flora of the Southeastern United States
Flora of the South-Central United States
Flora of the North-Central United States
Flora without expected TNC conservation status